Karki may refer to: 

 Karki, Azerbaijan, a landlocked exclave of Azerbaijan
 Karki, Honnavar, a village in Honnavar Taluk in Uttara Kannada district of Karnataka state in India
 Karki, Madhya Pradesh, a village in Shahdol district in the state of Madhya Pradesh in  India
 Karki (surname), a surname originating from Nepal
 Karki (name), name list
 Karki, universal meaning by Asiatic words 'kar + ki' = 'The Verb'

See also

Karri (disambiguation)